Dansville Municipal Airport  is a public use airport located one nautical mile (2 km) northwest of the central business district of Dansville, a village in Livingston County, New York, United States. It is owned by the Town of North Dansville.

Facilities and aircraft 
It has two asphalt paved runways: 14/32 which measures 3,500 x 100 feet (1,067 x 30 m) and Closed X18/36X Closed  which measures 2,443 x 100 feet (745 x 30 m).

For the 12-month period ending August 8, 2007, the airport had 48,050 aircraft operations, an average of 131 per day: 98% general aviation, 2% air taxi and 1% military. At that time there were 33 aircraft based at this airport: 61% single-engine, 9% multi-engine and 30% glider.

Balloon Festival 

Annually, around Labor Day weekend, the airport is the venue for the New York State Festival of Balloons.  The first such event was held in 1981 and given the designation of New York's official festival in 1997, beating out similar festivals in Glens Falls and Poughkeepsie for the designation.  As of 2007, it attracts about 35,000 visitors each year.

References

External links 
 page from NYSDOT airport directory

Airports in New York (state)
Buildings and structures in Livingston County, New York